The episodes of the anime series Ghost Hunt are based on the manga series written and illustrated by Shiho Inada. The series premiered on October 3, 2006 in Japan on TV Tokyo where it ran for twenty-five episodes until its conclusion. The series focuses on the work of the Shibuya Psychic Research Center, particularly its teenage manager Kazuya Shibuya and Mai Taniyama, a first-year high schooler who becomes his assistant after his usual assistant, Lin, is hurt while they are working on a case at Mai's school.

The anime is licensed for English release on Region 1 DVD by Funimation Entertainment, which released the entire series across two 2-disc volumes, and later in a single box set.



Episode list

References

External links
 Official TV Tokyo Ghost Hunt anime website 
 Official Funimation Ghost Hunt anime website
 

Ghost Hunt episodes